Yate is a town in Gloucestershire, England.

Yate may also refer to:
Yate and Pickup Bank, a civil parish in Lancashire, England
Yate (telephony engine), an open-source telephony engine
Yate (volcano), a volcano in southern Chile 
Yaté, a commune in the southern province of New Caledonia, Pacific Ocean
Yaté Dam, a dam in New Caledonia
Yaté River, a river in New Caledonia, Pacific Ocean
Yate baronets, two different baronetcies
 Eucalyptus cornuta or Yate, a species of tree native to Western Australia

People with the name
Sir Charles Yate, 1st Baronet (1849–1940), British administrator in India and politician
Charles Allix Lavington Yate (1872–1914), British First World War recipient of the Victoria Cross

Fictional
Yate Fulham, a character in Isaac Asimov's Foundation series